The 1973 Quebec general election was held on October 29, 1973 to elect members to National Assembly of Quebec, Canada.  The incumbent Quebec Liberal Party, led by Premier Robert Bourassa, won re-election, defeating the Parti Québécois, led by René Lévesque, and the Union Nationale (UN).

The Liberals won the largest majority government in the province's history, with 102 seats. In the process, they reduced the opposition to just eight seats (six PQ, two créditistes) in total.  The Parti Québécois held its own, losing only one seat, and despite having fewer seats, became the official Opposition, although PQ leader René Lévesque failed to win a seat in the Assembly.

The Union Nationale, which had held power until the previous 1970 general election, was wiped off the electoral map, losing all 17 of its seats. It would be the first time since the UN's founding in 1935 that the party was without representation in the legislature.  However, UN candidate Maurice Bellemare later won a seat in a 1974 by-election.

The popular vote was not as lopsided as the seat count would indicate, even though the Liberals won 54 percent of the popular vote. The Parti Québécois, for instance, won 30% of the popular vote, a significant improvement over their previous showing of 23% in the 1970 election. However, their support was spread out across the entire province, and was not concentrated in enough areas to translate into more seats. Quebec elections have historically produced significant disparities in seat counts.

Results
The overall results were:

See also
 List of Quebec premiers
 Politics of Quebec
 Timeline of Quebec history
 List of Quebec political parties
 30th National Assembly of Quebec

External links
 CBC TV video clip
 Results by party (total votes and seats won)
 Results for all ridings

References

Quebec general election
Elections in Quebec
General election
Quebec general election